Rosemary Brown may refer to:

Rosemary Brown (Canadian politician) (1940–2003), first black woman to be elected to a provincial legislature in Canada
Rosemary Brown (spiritualist) (1916–2001), English composer, reportedly a transcriber of the musical works of deceased composers
Rosemary Brown (born 1951), birth name of the singer and Irish presidential candidate Dana Rosemary Scallon
Rose Browne (1897–1986), African-American engineer, educator and author
Rosemary Brown (swimmer) (born 1961), Australian swimmer
Rosemary Brown (American politician) (born 1970), Republican member of the Pennsylvania House of Representatives